The Coolot Company Building was a historic commercial building located at 812 J Street in Sacramento, California.

Description and history 
The building was originally built in 1861 by Leland Stanford and he used one of the rooms as his office. It was also a part of the tunnel system as a part of the raised level of buildings in Sacramento. Replete with 25 office suites in the early 1990s, the edifice was still in use while neighboring buildings had all been demolished. After this point, the building itself was the subject of many fires during its years of vacancy. While plans were considered to incorporate the facade of the old building with new construction planned at its site, one last fire seriously damaged it in 2003 and it was subsequently demolished.

It was listed on the National Register of Historic Places on September 20, 1978.

References

External links

Commercial buildings on the National Register of Historic Places in California
Commercial buildings completed in 1920
Buildings and structures in Sacramento, California
Buildings and structures demolished in 2003
Demolished buildings and structures in California
1861 establishments in California
National Register of Historic Places in Sacramento, California